Blonde or Brunette is a surviving 1927 silent film comedy directed by Richard Rosson, produced  by Famous Players-Lasky and released by Paramount Pictures. It stars Adolphe Menjou, Greta Nissen and Arlette Marchal.

Copy held at Library of Congress.

Cast
Adolphe Menjou as Henri Martel
Greta Nissen as Fanny
Arlette Marchal as Blanche
Mary Carr as Grandmother
Evelyn Sherman as Mother-in-Law
Emile Chautard as Father-in-Law
Paul Weigel as Butler
Henry Sedley as Turney 
Andre Lanoy as Hubert
Henri Menjou as Detective

See also
 Blonde versus brunette rivalry

References

External links
 Blonde or Brunette @ IMDb.com
synopsis AllMovie.com

1927 films
1927 comedy films
American silent feature films
Silent American comedy films
American black-and-white films
Films directed by Richard Rosson
1920s English-language films
Paramount Pictures films
1920s American films